Sweden participated at the inaugural edition of the European Games in 2015.

Medal Tables

Medals by Games

Medals by sports

List of medallists

Competitors

See also
 Sweden at the Olympics
 Sweden at the Youth Olympics
 Sweden at the Paralympics

References